The 2019 Nigerian House of Representatives elections in Sokoto State was held on February 23, 2019, to elect members of the House of Representatives to represent Sokoto State, Nigeria.

Overview

Summary

References 

Sokoto State House of Representatives elections
House of Representatives
Sokoto